The 1999 Humboldt State Lumberjacks football team represented Humboldt State University during the 1999 NAIA football season. Humboldt State competed in the NAIA Columbia Football Association.

The 1999 Lumberjacks were led by head coach Fred Whitmire, in his ninth and final year at the helm. They played home games at the Redwood Bowl in Arcata, California. Humboldt State finished the season with a record of three wins and seven losses (3–7, 0–4 CFA). The Lumberjacks were outscored by their opponents 167–320 for the season. In nine years under coach Whitmire, the Lumberjacks compiled a record of 43–49–2.

Schedule

Team players in the NFL
No Humboldt State players were selected in the 2000 NFL Draft.

The following finished their college career in 1999, were not drafted, but played in the NFL.

References

Humboldt State
Humboldt State Lumberjacks football seasons
Humboldt State Lumberjacks football